The 1995 RTHK Top 10 Gold Songs Awards was held in 1995 for the 1994 music season.

Top 10 song awards
The top 10 songs (十大中文金曲) of 1995 are as follows.

Other awards

References
 RTHK top 10 gold song awards 1995

RTHK Top 10 Gold Songs Awards
Rthk Top 10 Gold Songs Awards, 1995
Rthk Top 10 Gold Songs Awards, 1995